APEJES Academy de Mfou is a Cameroonian football club based in Yaounde. They are a member of the Cameroonian Football Federation and Elite One, the topflight football league of Cameroon.

Achievements
Cameroon Première Division: 0

Cameroon Cup: 1
 2016.

Super Coupe Roger Milla: 0

Stadium
Currently the team plays at the Stade Ahmadou Ahidjo.

Performance in CAF competitions

References

External links

Football clubs in Yaoundé
Sports clubs in Cameroon